Strobilanthes sinuata (synonym Hemigraphis repanda) is a species of plant of family Acanthaceae.

References

Acanthaceae